Stenopterini is a tribe of beetles in the subfamily Cerambycinae, containing the following genera:

 Genus Callimoxys Kraatz, 1863
 Callimoxys fuscipennis (LeConte, 1861)
 Callimoxys gracilis Brullé, 1833
 Callimoxys nigrinus Williams & Hammond, 2011
 Callimoxys ocularis Hammond & Williams, 2011
 †Callimoxys primordialis Wickham, 1911 (fossil)
 Callimoxys pinorum Casey, 1924
 Callimoxys retusifer Holzschuh, 1999
 Callimoxys sanguinicollis (Olivier, 1795)
 Genus Callimus Mulsant, 1846
 Genus Guerryus Pic, 1903
 Genus Holangus Pic, 1902
 Genus Kunbir Lameere, 1890
 Genus Merionoeda Pascoe, 1858
 Genus Microdebilissa Pic, 1925
 Genus Obscuropterus Adlbauer, 2003
 Obscuropterus melanargyreus (White, 1855)
 Genus Stenopterus Illiger, 1804
 Stenopterus adlbaueri Sama, 1995
 Stenopterus ater Linnaeus, 1767
 Stenopterus atricornis Pic, 1891
 Stenopterus creticus Sama, 1995
 Stenopterus flavicornis Küster, 1846
 Stenopterus kraatzi Pic, 1892
 Stenopterus mauritanicus Lucas, 1847
 Stenopterus rufus Linnaeus, 1767
 Stenopterus similatus Holzschuh, 1979

References

 
Cerambycinae